The 2022–23 ACB season, also known as Liga Endesa for sponsorship reasons, is the 40th season of the top Spanish professional basketball league, since its establishment in 1983. It started on 28 September 2022 with the regular season and will end at the latest on 27 June 2023 with the finals.

Real Madrid is the defending champion.

Teams

Promotion and relegation (pre-season) 
A total of 18 teams contest the league, including 16 sides from the 2021–22 season and two promoted from the 2021–22 LEB Oro.

Teams promoted from LEB Oro
Covirán Granada
Bàsquet Girona

Teams relegated to LEB Oro
Hereda San Pablo Burgos
MoraBanc Andorra

Venues and locations

Personnel and sponsorship

Managerial changes

Regular season

League table

Results

Positions by round
The table lists the positions of teams after completion of each round. In order to preserve chronological evolvements, any postponed matches are not included in the round at which they were originally scheduled, but added to the full round they were played immediately afterwards.

Spanish clubs in European competitions

Attendances to arenas

Average attendances

Awards 
All official awards of the 2022–23 ACB season.

Player of the round 

Source:

Player of the month 

Source:

Notes

References

External links 
 Official website 

 
ACB
Spanish
Liga ACB seasons
Spain